Cinzia Sasso (born 25 August 1956, in Venice) is an Italian journalist and writer.

Biography 
Sasso graduated with honors in International Political Science from the University of Padua.

A professional journalist since 1982, she began working in the local newspapers of the local Venetian of Gruppo Editoriale L'Espresso: Il Mattino di Padova, La Tribuna di Treviso and La Nuova Venezia.

In 1985 Sasso arrived in the La Repubblica, drafting of Milan, where long cases in the news and judicial policy, then women and careers, and where she still works.

Sasso is part of the steering committee of the "School of Journalism Walter Tobagi" of the University of Milan.

Personal life 
After living together for twenty years, Sasso married the lawyer and politician Giuliano Pisapia 9 April 2011, with a civil wedding in the Palazzo Cavalli in Venice.

Literature

Works 
I saccheggiatori. Milano: facevano i politici, ma erano dei ladri, with Giuseppe Turani, Sperling & Kupfer, (1992)
Donne che amano il lavoro e la vita. La via femminile al successo, Sperling & Kupfer, (2002)
Un'ora sola io vorrei, with Susanna Zucchelli, Sperling & Kupfer (2005)

Notes

External links 
 Blog of the author of repubblica.it

1956 births
Living people
Writers from Venice
Italian journalists
University of Padua alumni